Yate Park and Ride is a park and ride facility located off the A432 road on the edge of Yate.

History 
Planning permission was approved in November 2020. It was funded by the West of England Combined Authority. Construction began in March 2021. The facility opened on 7 February 2022. No new bus routes were created for the park and ride, but several existing routes call at the facility.

Facilities 
The park and ride has 198 spaces for cars and 46 spaces for bikes.

References 

Park and ride schemes in the United Kingdom
Transport in South Gloucestershire District
2022 establishments in England